Hintsa is a football club based in Asmara, Eritrea.

Achievements
Eritrean Premier League: 1
2001

Performance in CAF competitions
CAF Champions League: 1 appearance
2002 – Preliminary Round

Football clubs in Eritrea